Henrik Toft (born 15 April 1981) is a Danish professional footballer, who currently plays for club Kolding BK.

Toft is known as a powerful striker, who is known for his height (1.96) and therefore also his great heading ability.

Honours
2005 Danish 1st Division Player of the Year

External links
Danish national team profile
 Official Danish league stats
Career stats, by Danmarks Radio

Living people
1981 births
Danish men's footballers
Denmark youth international footballers
SønderjyskE Fodbold players
Vejle Boldklub players
Herfølge Boldklub players
HB Køge players
AC Horsens players
Danish Superliga players
Danish 1st Division players
Association football forwards
People from Kolding Municipality
Sportspeople from the Region of Southern Denmark